The 2015–16 season is Queen of the South's third consecutive season back in the second tier of Scottish football and their third season in the Scottish Championship, having been promoted as champions from the Scottish Second Division at the end of the 2012–13 season. Queens will also be competing in the Challenge Cup, League Cup and the Scottish Cup.

Summary
Queen of the South finished seventh in the Scottish Championship.

The club reached the second round of the Challenge Cup, the second round of the League Cup and the fourth round of the Scottish Cup.

Management
The club began the 2015–16 season under the management of James Fowler and he remained in charge until 18 April 2016, when he left the club by mutual consent, two days after a 2–2 draw at already relegated Alloa Athletic. Queens objective was to finish in fourth and reach the play-offs for the third consecutive season. Gavin Skelton, who had been Fowler's assistant, was appointed caretaker manager alongside ex-club captain Jim Thomson, for the final two league matches of the season.

Results & fixtures

Pre season

Scottish Championship

Scottish Challenge Cup

Scottish League Cup

Scottish Cup

Player statistics

Captains

Squad 
Last updated 14 May 2016

|}

Disciplinary record

Top Scorers 
Last updated on 2 May 2016

Clean sheets
{| class="wikitable" style="font-size: 95%; text-align: center;"
|-
!width=15|
!width=15|
!width=15|
!width=150|Name
!width=80|Scottish Championship
!width=80|Challenge Cup
!width=80|League Cup
!width=80|Scottish Cup
!width=80|Total
|-
|1
|GK
|
|Robbie Thomson
|9
|1
|0
|0
|10
|-
|20
|GK
|
|James Atkinson
|1
|0
|0
|0
|1
|-
|
|
|
! Totals !! 10 !! 1 !! 0 !! 0 !! 11

Team statistics

League table

Division summary

Management statistics
Last updated on 2 May 2016

Transfers

Players in

Players out

See also
List of Queen of the South F.C. seasons

Notes

References

Queen of the South F.C. seasons
Queen of the South